The National Fenestration Rating Council (NFRC) is a United States 501(c)3 non-profit organization which sponsors an energy efficiency certification and labeling program for windows, doors, and skylights.

NFRC labels provide performance ratings for such products in five categories: U-value, Solar Heat Gain Coefficient, Visible Transmittance, Air Leakage, and Condensation Resistance. This allows architects, builders, code officials, contractors, home owners, and specifiers to compare the energy efficiency among products, and determine whether a product meets code.

References

External links

Standards organizations in the United States
Certification marks
Building engineering organizations
Energy conservation in the United States
Windows